Florent of Hainaut (also Floris or Florence; Hainaut, also spelled "Hainault") (c. 1255 – 23 January 1297) was Prince of Achaea from 1289 to his death, in right of his wife, Isabella of Villehardouin.  He was the son of John I of Avesnes and Adelaide of Holland. From his father he received the stadholdership (government) of Zeeland.

After he left Zeeland, he took up service with Charles II of Naples, who made him constable of the Kingdom of Naples. After his marriage with Isabella on 16 September 1289, they had one daughter, Matilda. She succeeded him and her mother as princess.

Florent settled with his wife in Morea. He negotiated the Treaty of Glarentsa with the Byzantine Empire in 1290. The situation for the Franks in Greece was hopeless by this time, however. The fall of the Angevins in Sicily meant that they were preoccupied with recouping territory there and few Western governments would send troops to defend Morea. Florent thus made peace and maintained it until 1293, when the Greeks retook Kalamata. Florent did not despair and did not reopen the war which had been ongoing until his succession: he instead sent an embassy in protest to Andronikos II Palaiologos, and the emperor returned Kalamata. In 1296, the Greeks retook the castle of Saint George in Arcadia. Florent besieged the castle, but died before it could be taken.

Sources
 
Grousset, René. L'Empire du Levant: Histoire de la Question d'Orient.
  

1297 deaths
Avesnes family
Princes of Achaea
Year of birth unknown
13th-century people from the Principality of Achaea